Amin Hayai (born June 9, 1970) is an Iranian actor. He has received various accolades, including two Crystal Simorgh, three Hafez Awards and an Iran's Film Critics and Writers Association Honorary Diploma, in addition to nomination for an Iran Cinema Celebration Award.

Career
He started acting in theater along with his education. After finishing high school, he entered military service, and also acted in the art center of air force army. In 1991 he acted in a theatrical show for kids with the directorship of Soraya Ghasemi. It took him long to get a main acting role in movies, and he was successful in his first movie Eve's Red Apple. He has also won the best male actor award in Fajr film festival for the film by Rasoul Sadr-Ameli, "The Night", in 2008.

Hayai appeared in the film Woodpecker in 2018. Hayai also will appear in the film We Like You Miss Yaya which he filmed in 2017. He was awarded the Diploma Honorary for Best Actor for Blazing at the Fajr Film Festival in 2018.

In 2019, he became a judge in the first Iranian Talent Show called Asre Jadid Produced by Ehsan alikhani.

Personal life 

He was married to Mona Bankipour and they have a son, Dara Hayai. They were divorced, and he is now married to Niloufar Khoshkholgh, who is an Iranian actress.

Filmography

Film

Web

References

External links
 
 Amin Hayai on Instagram

1970 births
Living people
Iranian comedians
People from Tehran
Iranian male actors
Iranian male singers
Male actors from Tehran
Iranian male film actors
Iranian stand-up comedians
Iranian male television actors
Crystal Simorgh for Best Actor winners